Göran Jakob Rosenberg (born 11 October 1948) is a Swedish journalist and author.

Biography and career
Rosenberg was born in Södertälje, Sweden, the son of David and Hala Rosenberg from Łódź in Poland, who both came to Sweden after having survived Nazi concentration camps during World War II. He has written about his father's story and his childhood in the book A Brief Stop on the Road from Auschwitz (2012). The book won the August Prize for literature in 2012.

Rosenberg worked at Sveriges Radio and Sveriges Television between 1972–1989, from 1985 to 1989 as the Washington-based US correspondent of Swedish Television. In 1990 he founded the monthly magazine Moderna Tider, of which he was editor-in-chief until 1999. Between 1991 and 2011 he was a columnist at Dagens Nyheter. Since 2012 he is a monthly columnist at Swedish Radio. He currently writes essays, reviews and commentaries for the Swedish daily Expressen.

Awards and recognitions, selection
1993 Stora Journalistpriset
2000 Honorary degree at the University of Gothenburg
2012 August Prize for A Brief Stop on the Road from Auschwitz
2014 Prix du Meilleur Livre Étranger Essay for A Brief Stop on the Road from Auschwitz

Selected bibliography
1991 – Friare kan ingen vara: den amerikanska idén från revolution till Reagan
1993 – Medborgaren som försvann
1994 – Da Capo al Fine
1996 –    Det förlorade landet   -en personlig historia
2000 – Tankar om journalistik
2004 – Plikten, profiten och konsten att vara människa
2006 – Utan facit
2012 – A Brief Stop on the Road from Auschwitz
2021 – Rabbi Marcus Ehrenpreis obesvarade kärlek (The Unrequited Love of Rabbi Marcus Ehrenpreis)

References

External links
Official website

Living people
1948 births
People from Södertälje
Swedish male writers
Swedish-language writers
Swedish journalists
Swedish Jews
Swedish people of Polish-Jewish descent
August Prize winners